Gluvo is a village in the municipality of Čučer-Sandevo, North Macedonia.

Demographics
According to the 2002 census, the village had a total of 349 inhabitants. Ethnic groups in the village include:

Macedonians 318
Serbs 31

References

Villages in Čučer-Sandevo Municipality